Ophicleide and Contra Ophicleide are  powerful pipe organ reed pipes used as organ stops. The name comes from the early brass instrument, the ophicleide, forerunner of the euphonium.

The Ophicleide is generally at 16′ pitch, and the Contra Ophicleide at 32′.  While they can be 8′ or 16′ reeds in a manual division, they are most commonly found in the pedal division of the organ.  Voiced to develop both maximum fundamental tone (as in the Bombarde) and overtone series (as in the Posaune), if the classic voicing technique and use of terminology are followed, the Ophicleide and Contra Ophicleide are among the most powerful and loudest organ stops.  Generally the only types of stop more powerful are the various forms of Trompette en chamade.  However, the Ophicleides require an extremely large instrument to balance their sound, and so are rarely built today, except into the largest of organs (about one hundred ranks and up). 

The Grand Ophicleide in the Boardwalk Hall Organ, Atlantic City, New Jersey, is recognized as the loudest organ stop in the world, voiced on 100″ of wind pressure.

See also
List of pipe organ stops

References

External links
Ophicleide entry at the Encyclopedia of Organ Stops

Reed type organ stops